Richard Wallace O'Neill (May 19, 1902 - August 18, 1974) was a player in the National Football League. He played for the Duluth Kelleys during the 1925 NFL season.

References
Oldest Living Pro Football Players - Wally O'Neill 1974 Necrology

People from Marquette, Michigan
Duluth Kelleys players
Wisconsin–Superior Yellowjackets football players
1902 births
1974 deaths